Hans Konrad Henriksen Foosnæs (2 February 1846 – 30 July 1917) was a Norwegian politician for the Liberal Party. He served as Minister of Agriculture from 1908 to 1910.

Personal life
He was born in Namdalseid. He was the grandson of politician, Hans Andersen Barlien.

Career
He was elected as a member of Beitstaden municipal council in 1878, and served as mayor from 1880 to 1907. He was elected to the Parliament of Norway from Nordre Trondhjems Amt in 1882, and then won five non-consecutive re-elections in 1888, 1891, 1894, 1897 and 1903.

In 1906 he stood for re-election for a seventh time, now in the constituency Snaasen as the constituencies had been restructured. He was challenged by no less than three other candidates from his own party; Ivar Aavatsmark, Ole Olsen Five and Lorents Mørkved. In the first round of voting Aavatsmark took the lead with 1,210 votes against Foosnæs' 1,145 votes. In the second round of voting, Foosnæs with N. E. Brenne gathered 1,476 votes, and he lost his seat to Aavatsmark who won it with 2,157 votes.

From 1908 to 1910 he served in Knudsen's First Cabinet as the Minister of Agriculture. Foosnæs tried to re-contest the seat in 1912, and gathered 1,513 votes. However, Aavatsmark with Mørkved as running mate won 2,642 votes and hence the seat. In 1915 Foosnæs finished a distant third, now also beaten by the Labour candidate.

References

1846 births
1917 deaths
Members of the Storting
Ministers of Agriculture and Food of Norway
Politicians from Nord-Trøndelag